Cannabis in Kuwait is illegal for all purposes, and possession of even small amounts of the drug is a criminal offence and can result in hefty prison time and significant fines.

Enforcement
Possession or personal use of cannabis can result in two years in prison plus fines. Punishment for drug-related crimes can be severe, up to and including the death penalty.

International smuggling
Cannabis and other drugs are transshipped from Afghanistan through Iran, to Kuwait, then to Europe.

References

Kuwait
Politics of Kuwait
Society of Kuwait